Faggan Singh Kulaste (born 18 May 1959) is an Indian politician who currently serving as the Minister of State for Rural Development  and Steel of India in the Government of India. He is a member of the Bharatiya Janata Party (BJP). 
He was sworn in as Union Minister of State in the Ministry of Steel on 30 May 2019 under Prime Minister Narendra Modi. 
Kulaste is elected as a member of the 17th Lok Sabha (2019–2024). 
He represents the Mandla constituency of Madhya Pradesh. 
He was also Minister of State in Modi government. 
He has previously been a member of the 11th, 12th, 13th, 14th, 16th and 17th Lok Sabha.

He represented the Mandla Lok Sabha Parliamentary seat from 1996 to 2009. 
After losing in 2009 to Basori Singh Masram of Congress, he was elected to Rajya Sabha in 2012. He regained the seat in 2014 Lok Sabha, defeating his Congress rival Omkar Markam.

Early life
Born in Barbati, District, Mandla (Madhya Pradesh), Faggan Singh Kulaste is married to Mrs. Savitri Kulaste. He has 3 daughters and 1 son.

Education
Kulaste completed his post graduation MA., BEd and LL.B. 
He completed his early education from Mandla College, Dr. Hari Singh Gaur University, Sagar and Rani Durgawati University, Jabalpur (Madhya Pradesh).

Positions held

Legislative 

 Union Minister of State, Ministry of Steel (2019 onwards)
 Union Minister of State, Ministry of Health and Family Welfare (July 2016 – Sept 2017)
 Union Minister of State, Ministry of Tribal Affairs (Nov 1999 – May 2004)
 Union Minister of State, Ministry of Parliamentary Affairs (Oct – Nov 1999)
 Member of Legislative Assembly, Madhya Pradesh (1990–92)

Within BJP 

 National President : BJP Scheduled Tribes Morcha, 2004 & 2010 (two terms)
 General Secretary : BJP Madhya Pradesh 2006-2010 (two terms)

Non-political activities 

 Akhil Bhartiya Adivasi Vikash Parishad, Madhya Pradesh, 2000
 National Secretary (In-charge) : BJP (ST Cell), 1996
 State General Secretary (In-charge) : BJP (ST Cell), 1993
 President : Akhil Bharatiya Adivasi Vikash Parishad, Madhya Pradesh, 1980
 Patron : Akhil Bharatiya Gond Sangh since 1998

Social and cultural activities 
Kulaste has been working for the propagation of education in society; encouraging tribals to keep alive their cultural activities by forming several committees; founder and organiser of educational units; providing free education to the weaker sections of the society; established Babalia Development Block for the upliftment of Adivasis and promotion of education. According to him liquor is a tonic in the COVID-19 pandemic. He had inaugurated an oxygen plant.

References

External links
 Members of Fourteenth Lok Sabha - Parliament of India website
 Members' Profile 17th Lok Sabha - Parliament of India Website

Living people
1959 births
Bharatiya Janata Party politicians from Madhya Pradesh
India MPs 2004–2009
People from Madhya Pradesh
People from Mandla
India MPs 1996–1997
India MPs 1998–1999
India MPs 1999–2004
Lok Sabha members from Madhya Pradesh
India MPs 2014–2019
Rajya Sabha members from Madhya Pradesh
Narendra Modi ministry
India MPs 2019–present